Adoxophyes planes is a species of moth of the family Tortricidae first described by Józef Razowski in 2013. It is found on Seram Island in Indonesia. The habitat consists of lower montane forests.

The wingspan is about 23 mm. The forewings are cream with rust and brown strigulation (fine streaks) and brown markings. The hindwings are cream.

Etymology
The species name refers to the systematic position of the species and is derived from Greek planes (meaning to stray).

References

Moths described in 2013
Adoxophyes
Moths of Indonesia